Fandango! is the fourth album by the American rock band ZZ Top, released in 1975. The album's first side consists of selections from live shows, with the second side being new studio recordings. A remastered and expanded edition of this album was released on February 28, 2006.

Album title
Fandango, from which the album gets its name, is a type of dance similar to flamenco.

Background
Frontman Billy Gibbons said of the album: The live capture wound up being in the can first. We had enough live material to make up one side of the disc, so we decided to go with the unusual move of making the album half live, half studio. It turned out to be a winning combination for us.

The album's opening song "Thunderbird", despite having ZZ Top writing credit, was originally written and performed by The Nightcaps, a band formed in the 1950s when the members were teenagers. The Nightcaps performed the song and distributed it on their album Wine, Wine, Wine but never applied for copyright. ZZ Top began performing the song as early as 1974, and has conceded that their version is lyrically and musically identical to the Nightcaps' song. The Nightcaps sued ZZ Top for copyright infringement but their claims were dismissed as ZZ Top had registered a copyright on the song in 1975.

The song "Heard It on the X" was written about the influence of Mexican border blaster radio stations (so-called "X Stations") on Texas and other parts of the United States, namechecking "Dr. B," an alias of Dr. John R. Brinkley.

Promotion and release
The only single released from the album was "Tush". The single peaked at #20 on the US Billboard Hot 100, making it the band's first top 40 single in the US. The song "Heard It on the X" also received heavy rotation on classic rock radio.

In the late 1980s the album was released on CD with the studio recordings being digitally remixed and the original 1975 mix version was discontinued. The remix version created controversy among fans because it significantly changed the sound of the instruments, especially the drums. The remix version was used on all early CD copies and was the only version available for over 20 years. 

A remastered and expanded edition of the album was released on February 28, 2006, containing three bonus live tracks. The 2006 edition is the first CD version to use Terry Manning's original 1975 mix. 

The album was re-released in 2009 on 180 gram vinyl using the original master tapes. It appears exactly the same except that it had a 180 gram vinyl LP sticker, by Back to Vinyl records.

Track listing

Tracks 1-3 (side A of the original LP) were recorded live at The Warehouse in New Orleans on April 12, 1974, "captured as it came down - hot, spontaneous and presented to you honestly, without the assistance of studio gimmicks".
Tracks 4-9 (side B) were new studio recordings.
Tracks 10-12 (of the expanded 2006 version) were recorded live at the Capitol Theatre in Passaic, New Jersey, on August 30, 1980.

Personnel
Billy Gibbons – guitar, vocals
Dusty Hill – bass, vocals
Frank Beard – drums, percussion

Production
Producer – Bill Ham
Engineers – Jim Reeves, John L. Venable, and, Norman Mershon for Record Plant Truck. Robin Brians, Terry Kane, Bob Ludwig (mastering), Terry Manning
Album concept – Bill Ham
Design – Bill Narum
Photography – John Dekalb

Charts

Certifications

References

External links 

 Commercial for the album Fandango! from the Texas Archive of the Moving Image

ZZ Top albums
1975 albums
Albums produced by Bill Ham
London Records albums